Jean Domat, or Daumat (30 November 162514 March 1696) was a French jurist.

Life
Domat was born at Clermont in Auvergne. He studied the humaniora in Paris, where he befriended Blaise Pascal, and later law at the University of Bourges. Domat closely sympathized with the Port-Royalists, and on Pascal's death he was entrusted with the latter's private papers. After Domat's promotion in 1645, he practised law in Clermont and was appointed a crown prosecutor there in 1655. In 1683, he retired from this office with a pension from Louis XIV to concentrate on his scholarship.

Principal work
Together with Antoine Dadin de Hauteserre, Antoine Favre and the Godefroy brothers, Domat was one of the few later French scholars of Roman law of international significance. He is principally known from his elaborate legal digest, in three quarto volumes, under the title of Lois civiles dans leur ordre naturel (1689, with 68 later editions), an undertaking for which Louis XIV settled on him a pension of 2,000 livres. A fourth volume, Le droit public, was published in 1697, a year after his death. After Hugo Doneau's more thorough but less consistent Commentarii iuris civilis (1589), the work was the first of this type of pan-European significance. It was to become one of the principal sources of the ancien droit on which the Napoleonic Code was later founded.

Domat's work was in line with earlier Humanist attempts to transform the seemingly random historical sources of law into a rational system of rules. However, as a supporter of a Cartesian juridical order, Domat endeavoured to found all law upon ethical or religious principles, his motto being "L'homme est fait par Dieu et pour Dieu" ("Man was made by God and for God"). The work was thus an attempt to establish a system of French law on the basis of moral principles, and it presented the contents of the Corpus Juris Civilis in the form of a new system of natural law.

After the work of Robert Joseph Pothier, Domat's work is regarded as the second most important influence on the Civil Code of Lower Canada.

Editions 

Lois civiles dans leur ordre naturel, 1689

Later life
Besides the Lois civiles, Domat prepared, in Latin, a selection of the laws in the Digesta and the Codex Justinianeus under the title Legum delectus (Paris, 1700; Amsterdam, 1703); it was subsequently appended to the Lois civiles. Domat died in Paris on 14 March 1696.

References

Further reading

A. Iglesias, "Philosophy and Law in Jean Domat" (Spanish), Ph.D. Legal history and philosophy-human rights, Thesis, 2009, U. Carlos III de Madrid.
D. Gilles, Jean Domat's juridical thought. From Grand siècle to civil french Code, (in French), Ph. D. Law, Thesis, Aix-Marseille III,  1994.
D. Gilles, « Les Lois civiles de Jean Domat, prémices des Codifications ? Du Code Napoléon au Code civil du Bas Canada », Revue juridique Thémis, Montréal, n. 43-1, 2009, pp. 2–49.
.
In the Journal des savants for 1843 are several papers on Domat by Victor Cousin, giving much information not otherwise accessible.

1625 births
1696 deaths
17th-century French lawyers
Jansenists